Santiago Cabrera (born 5 May 1978) is a Chilean-British actor who has worked mainly in the UK and United States. Cabrera is best known for his roles as the character Isaac Mendez in the television series Heroes, Lancelot in the BBC drama series Merlin, and Aramis in the BBC series The Musketeers. He was also the lead in the TV show Salvation as Darius Tanz, and played Captain Cristóbal "Cris" Rios in Star Trek: Picard.

Early life
Cabrera was born in Caracas, Venezuela, where his father, a Chilean diplomat, was stationed at the time. He is the middle child of three. Moving along with his father's career, Santiago grew up mainly in England, but also in Romania, Toronto and Madrid. His family returned to Chile when he was fifteen years old. He was captain of his football team in high school, and only tried acting when his teachers encouraged him. During his three years of training at the Drama Centre London from 2000 to 2003, Cabrera starred in productions of The Madras House, A Month in the Country, Napoli Milionaria, Britannicus, The Dutch Courtesan, The Strangeness of Others, Three Birds Alighting on a Field, and played the title character in The Last Days of Don Juan.

Career
Concurrent with his final year at the centre, he made his television debut with small roles in the British television series Battlefield Britain, Judge John Deed, Spooks and As If. His first role after graduating from drama school was Montano in Shakespeare's Othello, at the Northampton Theatre Royal. He also starred in the 2006 film Love and Other Disasters as the Argentinian Paolo Sarmiento, alongside Brittany Murphy and Matthew Rhys.

He has appeared on American television first in Empire, as Octavius. He appeared as Isaac Mendez in the NBC series Heroes; once the character's arc ended, he narrated some episodes of the BBC's spin-off documentary series Heroes Unmasked. He also played Lancelot in the BBC drama series Merlin and Aramis in The Musketeers.

In addition to his fluency in Spanish, English, French and Italian, Cabrera is skilled in tennis, hockey and scuba diving. On 20 January 2007 episode of the NBC Universal late-night programme Vivo Mun2, Cabrera discussed his semi-professional football career in London before he fully committed to acting. He also stated that C.D. Universidad Católica of Santiago is his favourite team, however, he remains a fan of London club Queens Park Rangers F.C., for which he was a mascot as a child. Although he considers Santiago his hometown, he splits his time between London and Los Angeles.

In 2007, Cabrera was cast as Aquaman in the unmade George Miller film Justice League: Mortal.

On 7 September 2008, Cabrera participated in Soccer Aid, a British charity football match in support of UNICEF. He later repeated this venture in 2014, playing once again for the Rest of the World. In November 2008 he played for the Hollywood United team in a special charity match raising money for people affected by the devastation of Hurricane Ike.

Santiago has also played the role of Darius Tanz in the CBS/Netflix show Salvation.

On 4 March 2019, CBS announced Cabrera was cast in Star Trek: Picard, starring Patrick Stewart, which started shooting in April 2019. He played the supporting role of Captain Cristobal Rios in the limited series.  Cabrera appeared in Disney's Godmothered in 2020.

On 9 September 2021, Cabrera announced he would return to Star Trek: Picard for the series' second season with a trailer posted to his Instagram. On May 5, 2022, Cabrera promoted the final episode of the second season of Picard on his Instagram. It was his last appearance on the series.

Personal life

Cabrera is married to Anna Marcea, a theatre director. Their son was born in April 2016.

Filmography

Film

Television

Video game

Theatre

Awards

Wins
2007, Future Classic Award, for Heroes
2011, Best Actor for La Vida de Los Peces

Nominations
2007, ALMA Award, Outstanding Actor – Television Series, Mini-Series or Television Movie, for Heroes

References

External links

 
 Santiago Cabrera in TV Guide

1978 births
Living people
Alumni of the Drama Centre London
21st-century Chilean male actors
Chilean male film actors
People from Caracas
English male actors
Chilean expatriates in England
Naturalized citizens of Chile